Randall William Cook (born 1951) is an American special effects artist most known for The Lord of the Rings trilogy. He worked on Ghostbusters, as designer, sculptor and animator of the 'Terror Dogs'; The Gate, as visual effects designer and director; King Kong as second unit director.  He currently works as a consultant and is preparing several personal properties for production.

Awards and recognition

Alongside Jim Rygiel, Cook won the Academy Award for Best Visual Effects for three consecutive years (2002, 2003 and 2004):

74th Academy Awards-The Lord of the Rings: The Fellowship of the Ring. Award shared with Jim Rygiel, Mark Stetson and Richard Taylor. Won.
75th Academy Awards-The Lord of the Rings: The Two Towers. Award shared with Alex Funke, Joe Letteri and Jim Rygiel. Won.
76th Academy Awards-The Lord of the Rings: The Return of the King. Award shared with Alex Funke, Joe Letteri and Jim Rygiel. Won.

References

External links

1951 births
Living people
Best Visual Effects Academy Award winners
Best Visual Effects BAFTA Award winners
Special effects people